Provincial elections were held in Pakistan on 17 December 1970, ten days after general elections. Members of the five Provincial assemblies were elected in Balochistan, East Pakistan, North West Frontier Province, Punjab and Sindh.

Results

Balochistan

East Pakistan

North-West Frontier Province

Punjab

Sindh

See also
1970 Azad Kashmiri general election

References

Pakistan
Provincial elections in Pakistan